Henri Martelli (25 February 1895 – 15 July 1980) was a 20th-century French composer.

Biography
Born in Bastia, Martelli was student of Charles-Marie Widor and Georges Caussade at the Conservatoire de Paris. In 1919, he graduated in law from Université de Paris. He was director of chamber music programmes on radio from 1940 to 1944, secretary of the Société Nationale de Musique and president of the French section of the ISCM in 1953. He wrote – in a neoclassical style – many chamber music works as well as lyrical and radio works.

He died in Paris aged 85.

Works

Incidental music 
 1923: La Chanson de Roland, opera (reworked 1962-63; Paris, 13 April 1967)
 1930: La Bouteille de Panurge, ballet (Paris, 24 February 1937)
 1951: Les Hommes de sable, ballet
 1958: Le Major Cravachon, opéra bouffe (Radiodiffusion française, 14 June 1959)

Orchestral music 
 1921: Rondo (1921)
 1922: Sarabande, Scherzo et Final 
 1922: Divertissement sarrazin 
 1928: Bas-reliefs assyriens, Op. 27 
 1931: Concerto for orchestra, Op. 31
 1938: Violin Concerto No. 1 
 1949: Piano Concerto
 1953: Symphony No. 1, for strings
 1956: Symphony No. 2, for strings 
 1956: Double Concerto for clarinet and bassoon
 1957: Symphonie No. 3, for large orchestra
 1957: Le Radeau de la Méduse, symphonic poem
 1966: Rhapsodie, for cello and orchestra
 1970: Concerto for oboe and orchestra

Chamber music
 Quatre pièces pour guitare, Op. 32
 1933: String Quartet No. 1
 1935: Piano Trio
 1936: Violin Sonata
 1942: Flute Sonata 
 1944: String Quartet No. 2
 1946: Sept duos, for violin and harp
 1947: Fantasiestück, Op. 67, for flute and piano (dedicated to Claude Delvincourt, director of the Paris Conservatory)
 1948: Cinq Études-Caprices, Op. 58,  for flute and piano (dedicated to Jean Pierre Rampal)
 1951: Trio, for flute, cello and piano
 1956: Divertissement Op. 86,  for harp (dedicated to Lily Laskine)
 1959: Viola Sonata
 1962: Concertstück, for viola and piano

Music for piano
 1941: Cinq danses

Sources
 Marc Vignal Dictionnaire de la musique française, Larousse

1895 births
1980 deaths
20th-century classical composers
20th-century French composers
Conservatoire de Paris alumni
French ballet composers
French male classical composers
French opera composers
Male opera composers
People from Bastia
20th-century French male musicians